Don Juan is a 1926 American romantic adventure film directed by Alan Crosland. It is the first feature-length film to utilize the Vitaphone sound-on-disc sound system with a synchronized musical score and sound effects, though it has no spoken dialogue.  The film is inspired by Lord Byron's 1821 epic poem of the same name. The screenplay was written by Bess Meredyth with intertitles by Maude Fulton and Walter Anthony.

Don Juan stars John Barrymore as the hand-kissing womanizer.

Plot

In the prologue, Don José, warned of his wife's infidelity, seals his wife's lover alive in his hiding place and drives her from the castle; abandoned to his lust, he is stabbed by his last mistress, and with his dying words he implores his son, Don Juan, to take all from women but yield nothing. Ten years later, young Don Juan, a graduate of the University of Pisa, is famous as a lover and pursued by many women, including the powerful Lucrezia Borgia, who invites him to her ball. His contempt for her incites her hatred of Adriana, the daughter of the Duke Della Varnese, with whom he is enraptured; and Lucrezia plots to marry her to Count Giano Donati, one of the Borgia henchmen, and poison the duke. Don Juan intervenes and thwarts the scheme, winning the love of Adriana, but the Borgia declare war on the duke's kinsmen, offering them safety if Adriana marries Donati; Don Juan is summoned to the wedding, but he prefers death to marriage with Lucrezia. He escapes and kills Donati in a duel. The lovers are led to the death-tower, but while Adriana pretends suicide, he escapes; and following a series of battles, he defeats his pursuers and is united with Adriana.

Cast

Premiere

Don Juan premiered August 5, 1926, at the Warner Theatre in New York City preceded by a program of other shorts demonstrating Vitaphone.

Production
Lou Tellegen, an early film matinee idol, had starred in a Broadway production based on the Don Juan legend in 1921. This play ran only 14 performances at the Garrick Theatre. The soundtrack for the film was performed by the New York Philharmonic. George Groves, on assignment from The Vitaphone Corporation, was charged with recording the soundtrack to the film. He devised an innovative, multi-microphone technique and performed a live mix of the 107-piece orchestra. In doing so he became the first music mixer in film history.

Reception
The film was a box-office success being Warners' biggest grossing film to date with earnings of $1,693,000 despite negative reviews from New York film critics. According to Warners records, the film earned $1,258,000 in the U.S. and $435,000 in other markets.

Opening night tickets cost $10, and it was the first film on Broadway to charge over $3 for a regular ticket with the top prices at $3.30 each night. In the five performances over the weekend, it grossed $13,787 with people literally fighting to get in and tickets changing hands for $5.

The film is recognized by American Film Institute in these lists:
 2001: AFI's 100 Years...100 Thrills – Nominated
 2002: AFI's 100 Years...100 Passions – Nominated

Legal issues 
On August 24, two weeks after the premier, The New York Times reported that ASCAP was pursuing claims of copyright infringement on behalf of publisher Robbins-Engel Music over the score for Don Juan. Composer William Axt had used two pieces that he had previously composed for a silent film mood music library owned by Robbins-Engel, "The Fire Agitato" and "In Gloomy Forest," along with several pieces of European classical music that were still under copyright. One of the compositions Axt interpolated in the score for Don Juan was "Till Eulenspiegel's Merry Pranks," a tone poem by the German composer Richard Strauss. At the time of the event, the Warner Theatre had a valid ASCAP license for public performance, and had paid the statutory mechanical royalties for the Vitaphone discs containing the soundtrack audio, but they had not licensed the copyrighted compositions specifically for synchronization rights. The matter was settled out of court, and the Warner Theatre's Music Director, Herman Heller, assigned Ottalie Mark to the task of creating a copyright research database for Warner Bros. Pictures to prevent further infringement claims.

Preservation
A print of Don Juan, including its Vitaphone soundtrack, still survives and is preserved at the UCLA Film and Television Archive.

Home media
In 2011, the film, along with the original Vitaphone sound shorts, was released on manufactured-on-demand DVD by the Warner Archive Collection.

See also

 List of early Warner Bros. talking features

References

External links

Lobby poster (DoctorMacro)
Atmospheric graveyard scene deleted from the final version of the film (archived)

1926 films
1926 adventure films
1926 romantic drama films
American adventure comedy films
American romantic drama films
American silent feature films
American black-and-white films
Films based on poems
Films based on the Don Juan legend
Films directed by Alan Crosland
Transitional sound films
Warner Bros. films
Adaptations of works by Lord Byron
Films set in Italy
Films set in the 16th century
Cultural depictions of Cesare Borgia
Cultural depictions of Lucrezia Borgia
Films with screenplays by Bess Meredyth
1926 romantic comedy films
Early sound films
1920s American films
Silent romantic drama films
Silent American comedy films
Silent adventure films
Silent American drama films